Problematische Naturen (“Problematical Natures,” 1861; translated into English as “Problematic Characters,” by Prof. Schele de Vere, New York, 1869) was a popular novel written by German novelist Friedrich Spielhagen exploring German personalities from around the time of the Revolutions of 1848.

Motivations
Like Freytag and Paul Heyse, Friedrich Spielhagen was chiefly concerned, in his novels, with defining the warring elements of German character and the opposing springs of German action in the period before and after the revolution of 1848. Like Freytag and Heyse, Spielhagen saw clearly the dangers that threatened the country, politically, religiously and morally from a reactionary aristocracy; like Heyse and unlike Freytag he saw the hope of the nation in the spread of an enlightened democracy rather than in a spiritual renaissance of the ruling classes.

Description

The hero of Problematische Naturen, Oswald Stein, is the mouthpiece for Spielhagen's revolutionary social theories. He is modeled after those characters of whom Goethe wrote “There are problematical natures that do not fit into any situation and who remain always unsatisfied. For them there arises a terrible conflict that consumes life without enjoyment.”

For Spielhagen, the conflict itself, even though it ends in defeat, is victory; the mere struggle against the domination of dead ideas is progress. For such a philosophy, there could be no better historical background than the Germany of 1848 and after, and Problematische Naturen with its sequel Durch Nacht zum Licht (1862), — although it squanders material for half a dozen novels, idealizes Teutonic morbidity, and forsakes art for tendency, — tells with remarkable vividness the story of the men and women who lived and thought and fought for freedom in Germany's day of hope.

Notes

References

Further reading
A notable description of the literature of this period is to be found in Julian Schmidt's Geschichte der Deutschen Literatur.

German historical novels
Revolutions of 1848
19th-century German novels